Lokmanya Tilak Terminus – Sultanpur Express is a superfast train of the Indian Railways connecting Lokmanya Tilak Terminus Mumbai in Maharashtra and Sultanpur Junction of Uttar Pradesh. It is currently being operated with 12143/12144 train numbers on Weekly basis.

Service

The 12143/Mumbai LTT - Sultanpur SF Express has an average speed of 57 km/hr and covers 1547 km in 27 hrs 15 mins. 12144/Sultanpur - Mumbai LTT SF Express has an average speed of 62 km/hr and 1547 km in 28 hrs 15 mins.

Route and halts 

The important halts of the train are:

Coach composite

The train has LHB rakes with max speed of 110 kmph. The train consists of 22 coaches :

 1 AC II Tier
 3 AC III Tier
 8 Sleeper Coaches
 9 General
 2 Second-class Luggage/parcel van

Traction

Both trains are hauled by a Bhusawal Loco Shed based WAP-4 electric locomotive from Kurla to Sultanpur and vice versa.

Rake Sharing 

This train shares its rake with 11053/11054 Lokmanya Tilak Terminus - Azamgarh Weekly Express.

Notes

External links 

 12143/Mumbai LTT - Sultanpur SF Express
 12144/Sultanpur - Mumbai LTT SF Express

References 

Transport in Mumbai
Transport in Sultanpur, Uttar Pradesh
Express trains in India
Rail transport in Maharashtra
Rail transport in Madhya Pradesh
Rail transport in Uttar Pradesh
Railway services introduced in 2011